Narendra Kumar Swain (June 25, 1939 – September 7, 2020) was an Indian politician from Odisha state. He was elected unopposed to the Rajya Sabha the Upper house of Indian Parliament from Odisha as a Biju Janata Dal candidate. He died September 7, 2020 after undergoing treatment at a hospital in Cuttack.

He joined the Communist Party of India in 1968 and quitted it in 1990. He joined Janata Dal in 1990 and was appointed General Secretary of Odisha Janata Dal in 1992. When Naveen Patnaik split Janata Dal in Odisha, he joined Biju Janata Dal in 2000 and was appointed as its General Secretary in 2001. He was Chairman of Odisha State Seeds Corporation from 2010 to 2013 and Odisha Tourism Development Corporation from 2013 to 2015.

References

External links

1939 births
2020 deaths
Rajya Sabha members from Odisha
Biju Janata Dal politicians
Janata Dal politicians